Duncan is an Anglicised form of Irish and Scottish Gaelic Donnchadh. One of the first people to bear the name was king of Dál Riata Dúnchad mac Dubáin, who was possibly the grandfather of Fiannamail ua Dúnchado-Fiannamail O'Dúnchado. The final letter n in the Anglicised Duncan seems to be a result of confusion in the Latin form of the name—Duncanus—with the Gaelic word ceann, meaning "head". One opinion is that the Gaelic Donnchadh is composed of the elements donn, meaning "dark or dark-haired man" or "chieftain"; and cath, meaning "battle", together meaning "dark-haired or dark warrior". Another opinion is that the Gaelic Donnchadh is composed of the elements donn, meaning "brown"; and chadh, meaning "chief" or "noble".

Variations

Royalty 
Duncan I of Scotland (died 1040), king of Alba, the inspiration for King Duncan in Shakespeare's play Macbeth
Duncan II of Scotland (1060–1094) king of Scots

Sports 
Duncan Atwood (born 1955), American javelin thrower
Duncan Clark (athlete) (1915–2003), Scottish hammer thrower
Duncan Edwards (1936–1958), English footballer
Duncan Ferguson (born 1971), Scottish footballer
Duncan Goodhew, Olympic swimmer for Great Britain
Duncan Keith, Canadian ice hockey player
Duncan Kibet (born 1978), Kenyan long-distance runner
Duncan Legere (born 1989), Canadian fencer
Duncan Lindsay (1902–1972), Scottish footballer
Duncan McClure, (1913–1991), Scottish footballer
Duncan Reid (born 1989), Hong Kong basketball player
Duncan Robinson (basketball), (born 1994), American professional basketball player for the Miami Heat
Duncan Weir (born 1991), Scottish rugby union player

Theatre and movies 
Duncan Brennan, American actor
Duncan Jones, British-American movie director and writer of Moon and Warcraft
Duncan Lamont, Scottish actor
Duncan Pflaster (born 1973), American playwright and actor
Duncan Regehr, Canadian stage, film and television actor

Literature 
Duncan Campbell Scott (1862-1947), Canadian poet

Music 
Duncan Coutts (born 1969), Canadian bassist for Our Lady Peace
Duncan James (born 1978), British singer
Duncan Lamont, British jazz saxophone player and composer
Duncan Laurence (born 1994), Dutch singer
Duncan Sheik, American singer

Politics 
Duncan Baird, American politician
Duncan Hunter, American politician
Duncan D. Hunter, American politician

Journalism 
Duncan McCue, Canadian journalist

Business 
 Duncan Bannatyne, Scottish entrepreneur
 Duncan Hines, American entrepreneur
 Duncan Phyfe (originally Duncan Fife, 1770–1854), Scottish-born American cabinetmaker

Fictional characters 
 Duncan, a character in the Total Drama series
 Duncan Quagmire, a character in the A Series of Unfortunate Events series by Lemony Snicket
 Duncan, a character in The Railway Series and its televised adaptation, Thomas and Friends
Duncan Dhu, character of the book Kidnapped by Robert Louis Stevenson inspiring the name of the Spanish band
 Duncan Douglas, a character in Freakazoid!
 Duncan Idaho, a character in the Dune universe created by Frank Herbert
 King Duncan, a character in the William Shakespeare play Macbeth, based on Duncan I of Scotland
 Duncan MacLeod, a character in Highlander: The Series
 Ser Duncan the Tall, a character in Tales of Dunk and Egg, a series of novellas written by George R. R. Martin, set in the same universe as A Song of Ice and Fire

See also
 Donnchadh
 Clan Duncan
 Duncan (surname)

References

Given names
English-language masculine given names
English masculine given names
Scottish masculine given names